JahadaKeron-1 is a village development committee in Morang District in the Kosi Zone of south-eastern BayarbanKeroun VDC nepal in Nepal. At the time of the 1991 Nepal census it had a population of 1080 people living in 298 individual households.

References

Populated places in Morang District